A monocular is a modified refracting telescope.

Monocular may also refer to:

 Monocular vision, vision in which each eye is used separately.
 Monocular O,  a variant of Cyrillic letter O

See also
Monocle